The 1941 Tasmanian Australian National Football League (TANFL) premiership season was an Australian rules football competition staged in Hobart, Tasmania, over fourteen roster rounds and two finals series matches between 10 May and 20 September 1941.

This was the final season of pre-World War II football, which resulted in most clubs struggling to field full squads of players due to enlistment in the military forces. In the off-season the TANFL considered instituting a competition for players too young to serve in the military, but it did not pursue the idea.

This was the final season of both Cananore and Lefroy Football Clubs, which both folded during the wartime cessation.

Participating clubs
Cananore Football Club
Lefroy Football Club
New Town Football Club
North Hobart Football Club

1941 TANFL club coaches
 Jack Cashman (Cananore)
 K. Fraser (Lefroy)
 Alf Sampson and E. Hanlon (stand-in) (New Town)
 Jack Metherell (North Hobart)

TANFL reserves grand final
Nth Hobart 7.4 (46) v Lefroy 2.6 (18) –  North Hobart Oval

TANFL under-19s grand final
State Schools Old Boys Football Association (SSOBFA) (Saturday, 13 September 1941) 
North West 5.5 (35) v Macalburn 4.6 (30)  –  New Town Oval

State grand final
(Saturday, 27 September 1941) 
Nth Hobart: 3.5 (23) | 5.8 (38) | 11.15 (81) | 13.18 (96)
City: 4.2 (26) | 4.8 (32) | 6.12 (48) | 12.19 (91)
Attendance: 3,960 at North Hobart Oval

Intrastate matches
(Saturday, 7 June 1941) 
TANFL 14.15 (99) v NTFA 14.9 (93) – Att: 4,000 at North Hobart Oval

(Saturday, 28 June 1941) 
TANFL 15.14 (104) v NTFA 10.20 (80) – Att: 4,000 (approx) at York Park

Lightning premiership matches
TANFL Patriotic Effort Benefit (Saturday, 19 July 1941) 
Cananore 4.5 (29) v Lefroy 4.2 (26)
Nth Hobart 2.8 (20) v New Town 3.1 (19)
Cananore 5.2 (32) v Nth Hobart 3.4 (22)
Attendance: 3,000 (Approx) at North Hobart Oval
Note: All matches played in two short halves; a total of £132 was raised to help the war effort.

Red Cross & Comforts Fund Benefit (Queen of Sport) (Saturday, 6 September 1941) 
Nth Hobart 4.7 (31) v Lefroy 0.6 (6)
Cananore 9.3 (57) v New Town 2.10 (22)
Nth Hobart 8.12 (60) v Cananore 1.6 (12)
Attendance: 1,570 at North Hobart Oval
Note: A total of £99 through gate takings was raised for the Queen of Sport war fund.

Leading goalkickers: TANFL
 Jack Metherell (North Hobart) – 64

Medal winners
 Max Abbott (North Hobart) – George Watt Memorial Medal
 T. Williams (New Town) – Allan Watt Medal (seconds)
 L. Tew (Buckingham) – V. A. Geard Medal (under-19s)

1941 TANFL ladder

Round 1
(Saturday, 10 May 1941) 
Nth Hobart 7.15 (57) v Cananore 6.17 (53) – Att: 1,000 (approx) at North Hobart Oval
Lefroy 16.24 (120) v New Town 6.13 (49) – Att: 600 (approx) at TCA Ground

Round 2
(Saturday, 17 May 1941) 
Nth Hobart 18.15 (123) v Lefroy 6.9 (45) – Att: 1,700 (approx) at North Hobart Oval
Cananore 14.13 (97) v New Town 10.11 (71) – Att: 630 at TCA Ground

Round 3
(Saturday, 24 May 1941) 
Nth Hobart 10.16 (76) v New Town 9.9 (63) – Att: 1,500 (approx) at North Hobart Oval
Lefroy 12.8 (80) v Cananore 8.18 (66) – Att: 760 at TCA Ground

Round 4
(Saturday, 31 May 1941) 
Lefroy 9.20 (74) v New Town 9.11 (65) – Att: 567 at North Hobart Oval
Nth Hobart 16.23 (119) v Cananore 13.10 (88) – Att: 700 (approx) at TCA Ground

Round 5
(Saturday, 14 June & Monday, 16 June 1941) 
Cananore 14.7 (91) v New Town 10.20 (80) – Att: 1,500 (approx) at North Hobart Oval (Saturday)
Nth Hobart 14.18 (102) v Lefroy 11.12 (78) – Att: 2,000 (approx) at North Hobart Oval (Monday)

Round 6
(Saturday, 21 June 1941) 
Cananore 15.18 (108) v Lefroy 10.16 (76) – Att: 1,200 (approx) at North Hobart Oval
Nth Hobart 19.26 (140) v New Town 7.14 (56) – Att: 800 at TCA Ground

Round 7
(Saturday, 5 July 1941) 
Cananore 7.8 (50) v Nth Hobart 4.12 (36) – Att: 520 at North Hobart Oval
New Town 10.19 (79) v Lefroy 5.9 (39) – Att: 110 at TCA Ground

Round 8
(Saturday, 12 July 1941) 
Nth Hobart 14.17 (101) v Lefroy 9.11 (65) – Att: 1,000 at North Hobart Oval
Cananore 13.17 (95) v New Town 13.16 (94) – Att: 600 (approx) at TCA Ground

Round 9
(Saturday, 26 July 1941) 
Nth Hobart 7.15 (57) v New Town 4.10 (34) – Att: 1,200 (approx) at North Hobart Oval
Cananore 14.17 (101) v Lefroy 13.18 (96) – Att: 550 at TCA Ground

Round 10
(Saturday, 2 August 1941) 
New Town 9.10 (64) v Lefroy 5.19 (49) – Att: 740 at North Hobart Oval
Nth Hobart 17.14 (116) v Cananore 12.17 (89) – Att: 1,300 at TCA Ground

Round 11
(Saturday, 9 August 1941) 
Cananore 18.8 (116) v New Town 12.16 (88) – Att: 966 at North Hobart Oval
Nth Hobart 16.16 (112) v Lefroy 13.10 (88) – Att: 690 at TCA Ground

Round 12
(Saturday, 16 August 1941) 
Cananore 13.19 (97) v Lefroy 9.12 (66) – Att: 1,000 at North Hobart Oval
New Town 15.13 (103) v Nth Hobart 12.14 (86) – Att: 800 (approx) at TCA Ground

Round 13
(Saturday, 23 August 1941) 
Nth Hobart 11.17 (83) v Cananore 9.12 (66) – Att: 1,600 (approx) at North Hobart Oval
New Town 23.16 (154) v Lefroy 12.9 (81) – Att: 511 at TCA Ground*
Note: Alf Sampson (New Town) kicked a TANFL record of 15 goals in this match, also a record 8 goals in the 4th Quarter.

Round 14
(Saturday, 30 August 1941) 
Nth Hobart 18.21 (129) v Lefroy 14.13 (97) – Att: 2,101 at North Hobart Oval (Double-Header)*
New Town 12.7 (79) v Cananore 10.7 (67) – Att: 2,101 at North Hobart Oval (Double-Header)
Note: This match was Lefroy Football Club's final TANFL match.

Semi-final
(Saturday, 13 September 1941) 
Cananore: 2.7 (19) | 6.9 (45) | 12.11 (83) | 15.13 (103)
New Town: 3.2 (20) | 8.7 (55) | 8.11 (59) | 11.12 (78)
Attendance: 2,900 at North Hobart Oval

Grand Final
(Saturday, 20 September 1941) 
Nth Hobart: 3.1 (19) | 6.7 (43) | 7.13 (55) | 12.17 (89)
Cananore: 4.2 (26) | 5.5 (35) | 8.9 (57) | 9.11 (65)
Attendance: 4,034 at North Hobart Oval*
Note: This was Cananore Football Club's final TANFL match.

References

All scores and statistics courtesy of the Hobart Mercury publications.

Tasmanian Football League seasons